Brian Thomas (born May 19, 1939) is an American politician of the Republican Party. He was a member of the Washington House of Representatives, representing the 5th district.

In 1989, Thomas was elected to the Issaquah School District and served as President before being elected to the legislature in 1993. In the legislature, Thomas served as Chair and as Co-chair of the House Finance Committee.

References

Republican Party members of the Washington House of Representatives
Living people
1939 births
Politicians from Tacoma, Washington
Oregon State University alumni
Pacific Lutheran University alumni